Astarabadi is an Iranian surname, derived from the city of "Astarabad" (former name of Gorgan) in northern Iran.  It may refer to:

 Bibi Khatoon Astarabadi (1858 or 1859 – 1921),  Iranian writer, satirist, and women's movement leader
 Fazlallah Astarabadi (c. 1340–1395), Iranian mystic, founder of the Ḥurūfī movement
 Mirza Mehdi Khan Astarabadi (18th century), Iranian Chief Minister
 Muhammad Ali Astarabadi (15th century), Iranian physician
 Muhammad Amin al-Astarabadi (died 1626), Iranian theologian

See also
Gorgani (disambiguation)
al-Jurjani

Persian-language surnames
Astarabadi